Members of the New South Wales Legislative Assembly who served in the 29th parliament held their seats from 1930 to 1932. They were elected at the 1930 state election, and at by-elections. The Nationalist Party was replaced by the United Australia Party in 1931. The Speaker was Frank Burke.

See also
Third Lang ministry
Results of the 1930 New South Wales state election
Candidates of the 1930 New South Wales state election

References

Members of New South Wales parliaments by term
20th-century Australian politicians